Chris Wettengel (born 17 April 1982) is an American tennis player.

Wettengel has a career high ATP singles ranking of 548 achieved on 29 October 2007. He also has a career high ATP doubles ranking of 518 achieved on 6 February 2012.

Wettengel made his ATP main draw debut at the 2008 U.S. Men's Clay Court Championships in the doubles draw partnering Alex Reichel, entering as alternates after an injury to Patrick Briaud.

Career titles

Doubles: 2

References

External links
 
 

1982 births
Living people
American male tennis players